The list of the venues of the 2026 Winter Olympics were part of the candidacy file.

Milano Cluster 
 San Siro Stadium – opening ceremony
 Mediolanum Forum – figure skating, short track
 PalaItalia Santa Giulia – main ice hockey venue (planned despite the games)
 PalaLido – second ice hockey venue (planned despite the games)
 Piazza del Duomo - Medal Plaza

Valtellina Cluster 
 Stelvio course, Bormio – alpine skiing
 Mottolino/Sitas - Tagliede/Carosello 3000, Livigno – snowboarding, freestyle skiing

Cortina d'Ampezzo Cluster 
 Olimpia delle Tofane course, Cortina d'Ampezzo – alpine skiing (technical resort constructed for FIS Alpine World Ski Championships 2021)
 Pista Eugenio Monti, Cortina – bobsleigh, luge and skeleton (modernisation and lighting works)
 Stadio Olimpico Del Ghiaccio, Cortina – curling
 Südtirol Arena, Antholz – biathlon

Val di Fiemme Cluster 
 Stadio del salto "Giuseppe Dal Ben", Predazzo – ski jumping, nordic combined (wind net required)
 Lago di Tesero Cross Country Stadium, Tesero – cross-country skiing, nordic combined
 Ice Rink Piné, Baselga di Piné – speed skating (venue to be rebuilt)

Verona 
 Verona Arena – closing ceremony

References

 
2026
Buildings and structures in Italy
Italy sport-related lists
Sport in Italy
Sports venues in Italy
2006